Roger Charles Jaensch (born 22 April 1971) is an Australian politician from Wynyard, Tasmania.  He was elected to the Tasmanian House of Assembly for the Liberal Party in the Division of Braddon at the 2014 state election.

Jaensch has studied Science at Monash University and has worked in agriculture, in both southern Africa and Western Australia.  He was Executive Chairman of the Cradle Coast Authority and was also a member of the Tourism Industry Council of Tasmania for ten years.  Jaensch is married with three children.

References

External links
Tasmanian Liberals – Roger Jaensch

1971 births
Living people
Liberal Party of Australia members of the Parliament of Tasmania
Monash University alumni
Members of the Tasmanian House of Assembly
21st-century Australian politicians
People from Ferntree Gully, Victoria
Politicians from Melbourne